William Harry Kitchener (born 3 November 1946) is an English former professional footballer who played in the Football League for West Ham United, Torquay United and AFC Bournemouth.

Career
Born in Arlesey, Kitchener began his career as an apprentice with West Ham United after leaving school. He turned professional in November 1963. In September 1966 he joined Torquay United on loan, making his debut on 17 September 1966 in a 5–2 home win against Walsall. He played 25 games before returning to Upton Park. He finally made his Hammers' debut in a First Division away game against Nottingham Forest on 18 March 1967. He won an extended run in the first team, making 11 appearances for West Ham, before leaving in December 1967 to become Torquay's record signing.
He immediately established himself in the side, taking Bobby Baxter's place at left-back, though also played in the centre of defence when required. By the end of his second spell with Torquay, he had played a further 142 games, scoring five goals.

In July 1971, he moved to AFC Bournemouth, managed by his former West Ham and Torquay teammate John Bond in July 1971, but stayed only one season with the Cherries before leaving league football, joining Cambridge City. He subsequently played for Wealdstone, Christchurch and New Milton.

Outside of football he had joined the Devon & Cornwall Police Force whilst with Torquay, and was later stationed at Burley in the New Forest for many years.

References

1946 births
Living people
People from Arlesey
Footballers from Bedfordshire
English footballers
West Ham United F.C. players
Torquay United F.C. players
AFC Bournemouth players
Wealdstone F.C. players
Christchurch F.C. players
Cambridge City F.C. players
New Milton Town F.C. players
Officers in English police forces
Association football fullbacks
Association football defenders